This is a partial list of Japanese language films:

0-9
2LDK (2002)
964 Pinocchio (1991)

A

About Love (2005)
Adrenaline Drive (1999)
After Life (1998)
Aiki (2002)
Akira (1988)
Alakazam the Great (1960)
Alive (2002)
All About Lily Chou-Chou (Rirī Shushu no Subete) (2001)
All Monsters Attack (Gojira, Minira, Gabara: Ōru Kaijū Daishingeki) (1969)
Another Heaven (2000)

Angel's Egg (Tenshi no Tamago) (1985)
Appleseed (2004)
Appleseed Ex Machina (2007)
Aragami (2003)
Assassination Classroom (2015)
Atragon (1963)
Audition (1999)
An Autumn Afternoon (Sanma no Aji) (1962)
Avalon (2001)
Azumi (2003)
Azumi 2: Death or Love (2005)

B

Backdancers! (2006)
The Bad Sleep Well (Warui yatsu hodo yoku nemuru) (1960)
The Ballad of Narayama (Narayama bushikou) (1958)
Battle Royale (2000)
Battle Royale II: Requiem (2003)
Blood and Bones (2004)
Blood: The Last Vampire (2000)
Big Bang Love, Juvenile A (2006)
Big Man Japan (2007)
The Bird People in China (Chûgoku no chôjin) (1998)

Black Rain (Kuroi Ame) (1989)
Blue Spring (Aoi haru) (2001)
Boiling Point (3-4X jugatsu) (1990)
Bounce ko gals (1998)
Branded to Kill (Koroshi no Rakuin) (1967)
Bright Future (Akarui Mirai) (2003)
Brother (2000)
Bubble Fiction: Boom or Bust (2007)
The Burmese Harp aka Harp of Burma (Biruma no tategoto) (1956, with a remake in 1985)

C

Casshern (2004)
Castle in the Sky (Tenkū no Shiro Rapyuta) (1986)
The Castle of Cagliostro (Rupan Sansei: Kariosutoro no Shiro) (1979)
The Cat Returns (Neko no Ongaeshi) (2002)
Chushingura: Hana no Maki, Yuki no Maki (1962)

Cleopatra (1970)
Cruel Story of Youth (Seishun Zankoku Monogatari) (1960)
Cure (1997)
Cutie Honey (2004)

D

Dark Water (Honogurai mizu no soko kara) (2002)
Death Note (2006)
Densha Otoko (2005)
Dersu Uzala (1975)
Destroy All Monsters (Kaijū Sōshingeki) (1968)
Distance (2001)
Dodesukaden (1970)

Dogora (1964)
Dolls (2002)
Doraemon films
Double Suicide (Shinjû: Ten no amijima) (1969)
Dreams (Yume) (1990)
Drugstore Girl (2003)
Drunken Angel (Yoidore Tenshi) (1948)

E
Early Spring (1956)
Early Summer (1951)
The Eel (1991)
Eros Plus Massacre (1970)
Equinox Flower (1958)
Eureka (2000)

F

The Family Game (1983)
Female Yakuza Tale: Inquisition and Torture (1973)
Fires on the Plain (Nobi) (1959)
The Flavor of Green Tea over Rice (Ochazuke no aji) (1952)

Floating Weeds (Ukikusa) (1959)
Flying Phantom Ship (1969)
The Funeral (Ososhiki) (1984)

G

G@me (2003)
Gamera vs. Jiger (1970)
Gamera vs. Zigra (1971)
Genius Party (2007)
Genius Party Beyond (2008)
Getting Any? (Minnā, yatteru ka?) (1995)
Get Up! (Geroppa!) (2003)
Ghidorah, the Three-Headed Monster (1964)
Ghost in the Shell (1995)
Ghost Stories of Wanderer at Honjo (1957)
Glory to the Filmmaker! (2007)
Gigantis, the Fire Monster (1955)
Go (2001)
Go, Go Second Time Virgin (1969)
Godzilla (1954)
Godzilla vs. Biollante (1989)
Godzilla vs. Destoroyah (1995)

Godzilla vs. Gigan (1972)
Godzilla vs. Hedorah (1971)
Godzilla vs. King Ghidorah (1991)
Godzilla vs. Mechagodzilla (1974)
Godzilla vs. Mechagodzilla II (1993)
Godzilla vs. Megalon (1973)
Godzilla vs. Mothra (1992)
Godzilla vs. SpaceGodzilla (1994)
Godzilla vs. the Sea Monster (aka Ebirah, Horror of the Deep) (1966)
Godzilla: Final Wars (2004)
Gojoe: Spirit War Chronicle (2000)
Good Morning (Ohayō) (1959)
Gonin (1995)
Gorath (1962)
Gozu (2003)
Grave of the Fireflies (Hotaru no Haka) (1988)

H

Hana-bi (1997)
The Happiness of the Katakuris (Katakuri-ke no kōfuku) (2001)
Harakiri (1962)
Helen the Baby Fox (Kogitsune Helen) (2006)
The Hidden Fortress (Kakushi toride no san akunin) (1958)
High and Low (Tengoku to jigoku) (1963)

Himitsu (1999)
Hols: Prince of the Sun (Taiyō no Ōji: Horusu no Daibōken) (1968)
House of Himiko (Mezon do Himiko, La Maison de Himiko) (2005)
Howl's Moving Castle (Hauru no ugoku shiro) (2004)
The Human Condition trilogy (1959–61)
Humanity and Paper Balloons (Ninjo Kami Fusen) (1937)

I

I.K.U. (2001)
I Can Hear the Sea (Umi ga Kikoeru) (1993)
I Like You, I Like You Very Much (Anata-ga suki desu, dai suki desu) (1994)
Ichi the Killer (Koroshiya Ichi) (2001)
The Idiot (Hakuchi) (1951)
Ikiru (1952)
In the Realm of the Senses (Ai no Corrida) (1976)

Innocence: Ghost in the Shell (2004)
Inochi (2002 )
It's Only Talk (2005)
The Insect Woman (1963)
Invasion of Astro-Monster (1965)
Izo (2004)

J
Jam Films (2002)
Jam Films 2 (2003)
Jam Films S (2005)
Jin-Roh (1999)
Ju-on
Justice (2002)

K

Kagemusha (1980)
Kairo (2001)
Kamen Rider: The First (2005)
Kamen Rider Kabuto: God Speed Love (2006)
Kanto Wanderer (1963)
Kids Return (1996)

Kiki's Delivery Service (Majo no Takkyūbin) (1989)
Kikujiro (1999)
King Kong vs. Godzilla (1962)
Kwaidan (1964)
Kagen no Tsuki (2004)

L

Lady Joker (2004)
Lady Sazen and the Drenched Swallow Sword (On'na hidarizen nuretsubame katate kiri) (1969)
The Last Dance (Daibyonin) (1993)
Late Autumn (Akibiyori) (1960)
Late Chrysanthemums
Late Spring (Banshun) (1949)
La Maison de Himiko aka Mezon do Himiko, House of Himiko (2005)
Legendary Crocodile, Jake and His Friends

The Life of Oharu (1952)
Longinus (2004)
Love & Pop (1998)
Love Is Strength (1930)
Love Letter (1995)
The Lower Depths (1957)
Lupin III: The Mystery of Mamo (1978)

M

Maborosi (1995)
Maiko Haaaan!!! (2007)
The Makioka Sisters (1983)
Matango (1963)Memories (1995)Merry Christmas, Mr. Lawrence (1983)Metropolis (2001)Mezon do Himiko aka House of Himiko, La Maison de Himiko (2005)Millennium Actress (2001)Minbo (1992)Momotaro's Divine Sea Warriors (1945)Moon Child (2003)Mothra vs. Godzilla (1964)Mura no ShashinshuuMy Neighbor Totoro (Tonari no Totoro) (1988)

NNaked Blood (1996)The Naked Island (1960)Nana (2005)Nana 2 (2006)Nausicaä of the Valley of the Wind (Kaze no tani no Naushika) (1984)Night and Fog in Japan (Nihon no yoru to kiri) (1960)Nobody Knows (Dare mo shiranai) (2004)Norwegian Wood (Noruwei no mori) (2010)

OOne Missed Call (Chakushin Ari) (2003)One Missed Call 2 (Chakushin Ari 2) (2005)One Missed Call: Final (Chakushin Ari Final) (2006)Onibaba (1964)Only Yesterday (Omohide poro poro) (1991)Onmyoji (2001)Onmyoji II (2003)Otoko wa Tsurai yo (1969-95)Otoko-tachi no Yamato (2005)

PPaprika (2006)Perfect Blue (1997)Pistol Opera (2001)Pom Poko (Heisei Tanuki Gassen Ponpoko) (1994)Ponyo (Gake no Ue no Ponyo) (2008)Porco Rosso (Kurenai no Buta) (1992)Princess Mononoke (Mononoke Hime) (1997)Princess Raccoon (Operetta Tanuki Goten) (2005)

QQuill (2004)Queer Boys and Girls on the Shinkansen (2004)

RRan (1985)Rasen (1998)Rashomon (1950)Red Beard (Akahige) (1965)Repast (1951)The Return of Godzilla (1984)Returner (2002)Ring (1998)Ring 0: Birthday (2000)Ring 2 (1999)Royal Space Force: The Wings of Honneamise (1987)Ryu ga Gotoku (2007)Ringing Bell (1978)

SSalaryman Kintarō (1999)Samurai I (1954)Samurai II (1955)Samurai III (1956)Sanjuro (Tsubaki Sanjūrō) (1962)Sanshiro Sugata (1943)Sansho the Bailiff (1954)A Scene at the Sea (1991)The Sea Is Watching (2002)Seven Samurai (1954)Shall We Dance? (1996)Shiki-Jitsu (2000)
Shimotsuma Monogatari (aka Kamikaze Girls) (2004)
Sky High (2003)
Son of Godzilla (1967)

Sonatine (1993)
Spirited Away (Sen to Chihiro no Kamikakushi) (2001)
Spring Snow (2005)
Steamboy (2004)
Stray Dog (Nora-inu) (1949)
Suicide Club (Jisatsu Sākuru) (2000)
Suicide Manual (2003)
Sukiyaki Western: Django (2007)
Sun Scarred (2006)
Supermarket Woman (1996)
Survive Style 5+ (2004)
Swallowtail Butterfly (1996)
Swing Girls (2004)
Sword of Alexander (2007)
The Sword of Doom (1966)

T

Taboo (Gohatto) (1999)
Takeshis' (2005)
The Tale of the White Serpent (1958)
Tales from Earthsea (2006)
Tales of a Golden Geisha (1990)
Tampopo (1985)
The Taste of Tea (2004)
Tattooed Life (Irezumi ichidai) (1965)
A Taxing Woman (Marusa no onna) (1987)
A Taxing Woman 2 (1988)

Tenshi (2005)
Terror of Mechagodzilla (1975)
Tetsuo: The Iron Man (1989)
Tetsuo II: Body Hammer (1992)
Throne of Blood (Kumonosu-jō ) (1957)
Tokyo Decadence aka Topaz (Topāzu) (1992)
Tokyo Eyes (1998)
Tokyo Godfathers (2003)
Tokyo Story (Tokyo Monogatari) (1953)
Tony Takitani (2004)
The Twilight Samurai (2002)

U
Ugetsu (1953)
Under the Flag of the Rising Sun (1972)
Unlock Your Heart (2021)
Umizaru (2004)
Uzumaki (2000)

V

Vampire Hunter D (1985)
Vampire Hunter D: Bloodlust (2000)
Versus (2000)
Vexille (2007)

Violent Cop (Sono otoko, kyōbō ni tsuki) (1989)
Virus (1980)
Vital (2004)

W

Waru (2006)
Waru: kanketsu-hen (2006)
Waterboys (2001)
Welcome Back, Mr. McDonald (1997)
When a Woman Ascends the Stairs (1930)

When the Last Sword Is Drawn (Mibu gishi den) (2003)
Whisper of the Heart (Mimi wo Sumaseba) (1995)
wkw/tk/1996@7'55"hk.net (1996)
Woman in the Dunes (Suna no Onna) (1964)

Y
Yojimbo (1961)
Yumeji (1991)

Z
Zatōichi series (1962–89)
Zatōichi (2003)
Zebraman (2004)
Zigeunerweisen (Tsigoineruwaizen) (1980)

See also
List of foreign films set in Japan

Japanese